Arthur Vermeeren (born 7 February 2005) is a Belgian footballer who plays for Royal Antwerp.

Career
Vermeeren made his professional debut for Royal Antwerp as a second half substitute in the 2022–23 UEFA Europa Conference League at home in Antwerp at the Bosuilstadion in a 2-0 second leg win against Lillestrøm SK on 11 August 2022. He told the media after his debut that he couldn’t have imagined a better debut. He received praise from coach Mark Van Bommel who was quoted as saying “Arthur is a smart footballer, a fun guy to work with. He is eager to learn and show he can play. So he will get some playing time. He enjoyed it, I think. It's nice to see."

References

2005 births
People from Lier, Belgium
Living people
Belgian footballers
Belgium youth international footballers
Royal Antwerp F.C. players